Jawad Ahmed is a Pakistani pop singer and musician turned politician. Jawad Ahmed is currently chairman of Barabri Party Pakistan.

Early life and career
Jawad Ahmad was born into a Kashmiri family who immigrated to Pakistan after independence. Both his parents were college professors.
Jawad Ahmad received a degree in Mechanical Engineering from the University of Engineering and Technology, Lahore. He also used to participate in the musical and literary societies of the above university. He was initially a member of the pop musical band Jupiters along with another famous pop singer Ali Azmat. This musical group later disbanded and Jawad Ahmad later decided to launch his solo career.

"Jawad Ahmad, one of the most renowned artists of Pakistan, first reached fame with his song "Allah Meray Dil Kay Ander" which showcased his fondness of Sufism.

While he has received no formal education in music, most of his songs are written and composed by him. He draws inspiration from a diverse range of musical personalities such as Ustad Amanat Ali Khan, Mehdi Hassan, Ustad Salamat Ali Khan, Tufail Niazi, Pathanay Khan, Hamid Ali Bela, Madam Noor Jehan, Lata Mangeshkar, Asha Bhosle, Nusrat Fateh Ali Khan, Kishore Kumar, Eagles, Elvis Presley, Mohammed Rafi.

So far, Jawad Ahmad has established his presence in the music industry through four albums.

In 2002, he has been appointed by the Ministry of Health and the UNICEF as the ambassador of Pakistan for the eradication of Polio. British Council Beyond Borders project, awareness regarding the dangers of drug addiction. In this regard, he has used his talent to produce a song called "Tum abhi to aa kar"' accompanied by a video to portray the social impact on an individual of drug intake. He sang another social awareness song "Taaleem Sub Kay Liey" for a project of US aid.

Another turf is a program against illiteracy, which he has been exploring. In conjunction with this, he is running ten schools in the least developed areas of Pakistan under the 'Taleem for All' program.

Discography

Albums

Most famous songs

Filmography
 Pakistani film Moosa Khan (2001) (music and lyrics by Jawad Ahmad)
 Pakistani and Indian joint-venture film Virsa (2010) (music arranged by Jawad Ahmad)

Television
Jawad Ahmed has done hosting for television and has performed for morale boosting of Pakistani soldiers. He also did the documentary series Har Dam Tayyar for the Pakistan Armed Forces in 2002 including:
 Sons of the Soil for Pakistan Army
 Power of the Sea for Pakistan Navy
 Flying Tigers for Pakistan Air Force

Awards

Political career 
Jawad Ahmad enters into politics by announcing his own political party Barabri Party Pakistan In the 2018 general elections of Pakistan, Jawad Ahmad contested the parliamentary seat of NA 131 against chairman PTI - later the Prime minister of Pakistan, Imran Khan and Khawaja Saad Rafique of PML-N (now a member of the national assembly).

References

External links
 , Filmography of Jawad Ahmad

1970 births
Living people
Pakistani political party founders
Pakistani pop singers
Pakistani playback singers
Pakistani composers
Punjabi-language singers
Punjabi people
Recipients of Tamgha-e-Imtiaz
Government College University, Lahore alumni
Pakistani mechanical engineers
University of Engineering and Technology, Lahore alumni
Singers from Lahore